Fiona Kellock (born 26 October 1948) is a British former swimmer. She competed in two events at the 1968 Summer Olympics.

References

1948 births
Living people
British female swimmers
Olympic swimmers of Great Britain
Swimmers at the 1968 Summer Olympics
Sportspeople from Glasgow